Little Cholame Creek is a perennial stream in southeastern Monterey County, California, United States. From there, the creek flows southeast along Parkfield-Coalinga Road, before reaching confluence with Cholame Creek.

History
"Cholame" is a Yokuts Native American word meaning "the beautiful one".  The creek runs through the northern part of Cholame Valley, along Parkfield-Coalinga Road, and on through the small town of Parkfield before crossing the San Andreas Fault and merging with Cholame Creek.

See also
 Riparian zone

References

External links
 

Rivers of Monterey County, California
Salinas River (California)
Rivers of Northern California